Trent Loiero (born 27 February 2001) is an Australian professional rugby league footballer who plays as a  forward for the Melbourne Storm in the NRL.

Background
Loiero played his junior rugby league for the Kawana Dolphins and attended Mountain Creek State High School, Sunshine Coast before being signed by the Melbourne Storm. Loiero is of Italian descent.

Playing career
In 2018 and 2019, Loiero played for the Sunshine Coast Falcons Mal Meninga Cup and Hastings Deering Colts sides. On 5 June 2019, he played for Queensland under-18 in their 34–12 win over New South Wales. Later in 2019, he made his Queensland Cup debut for the Falcons. On 20 September 2019, he scored a try for the Falcons in their Hastings Deering Colts Grand Final win over the Wynnum Manly Seagulls.

In February 2020, Loiero played for the Storm at the 2020 NRL Nines in Perth. On 22 February 2020, he played in the Storm's pre-season trial against the New Zealand Warriors in Palmerston North.

2021
In Round 4 of the 2021 NRL season, Loiero made his NRL debut for the Melbourne club against the Brisbane Broncos. He had his debut jersey (cap 212) presented to him by Ryan Hinchcliffe.

References

External links
Melbourne Storm profile
QRL profile

2001 births
Living people
Australian people of Italian descent
Australian rugby league players
Melbourne Storm players
Rugby league players from Nambour, Queensland
Rugby league second-rows
Sunshine Coast Falcons players